Revolution Of The Heart is Howard Jones's eighth album, released in 2005. This album marked a return to the electronic production that featured on Jones' early albums. A number of promo singles were released - "Just Look at You Now" and "Revolution of the Heart". Notably, the album's lyrics are broadly influenced by Nichiren Buddhism which Jones began practicing in the early 90s. The album was released in a number of formats including a limited edition version sold through Jones' website which sold out quickly. A double disc was released in some territories which included a number of remixed tracks, while the Japanese edition contained some reworked versions of old hits as bonus tracks.

Track listing

"Slip Away" is performed by Mohito featuring Howard Jones.

Personnel
 Howard Jones – vocals, acoustic piano, Moog synthesizer, keyboard programming, producer
 Robbie Bronnimann – virtual instruments, Macintosh computer, sound design, producer, mixing
 Robin Boult – guitar
 Shaz Sparks – backing vocals (1, 3, 4)
 Ian Walden – sleeve design, illustration, additional and image photography
 Freddie Walker – cover photography

References

Howard Jones (English musician) albums
2005 albums